McCabe may refer to:

People
McCabe (surname), origin of the names MacCabe/McCabe and a list of people with the surnames

Places
McCabe Memorial Church
McCabe Creek (disambiguation)
McCabe school
McCabe Lake

Music
Live at McCabe's (disambiguation), multiple albums

Other
McCabe v. Atchison
McCabe complexity of software
McCabe–Thiele method
McCabe-Powers Body Company
McCabe's Guitar Shop
McCabe & Mrs. Miller
Scali, McCabe, Sloves